A chief solutions officer (CSO) is a corporate title referring to an executive responsible for the identification, development and delivery of business solutions and services. The primary focus of a chief solutions officer and general manager is to drive growth for the company by creating value for his or her stakeholders. Most often the position reports to the chief executive officer.

Responsibilities 
The chief solutions officer is responsible for the identification and design of new products, services and technologies, the development of strategies, capabilities and the inception of programs and projects to exploit those opportunities.

See also 

 Chief product officer
Chief services officer
 Chief technology officer
 Chief information officer
 Chief digital officer

References 

Corporate governance

Business occupations
Management occupations